Flower From the Fields of Alabama is an album by the American musician Norman Blake, released in 2001.

Track listing 
All songs traditional unless otherwise noted.
 "Salty Dog" – 4:21
 "Bonaparte's Grand March" – 5:20
 "The Slopes of Beech Mountain" (Blake) – 3:10
 "Sitting on Top of the World"" (Lonnie Chatmon, Walter Vinson) – 6:22
 "Radio Joe" (Blake) – 3:57
 "Chasin' Rainbows" – 3:33
 "Flower from the Fields of Alabama" – 4:07
 "Texas Gales" – 4:01
 "All Go Hungry Hash House" – 3:48
 "So Tired" – 5:11
 "The Gambler's Dying Words" – 2:50
 "Little Bunch of Roses" – 3:16
 "Eastbound Freight Train" (Grandpa Jones) – 3:33
 "The Burial of Wild Bill" – 3:23
 "T.A.G. Railroad Rag" (Blake) – 6:10
 "If We Never Meet Again" (Albert E. Brumley) – 5:19

Personnel
Norman Blake - guitar, mandolin, vocals, fiddle, slide guitar
Bob Chuckrow - guitar, harmony vocal, mandola

References

2001 albums
Norman Blake (American musician) albums